The 2020–21 CSA 4-Day Franchise Series was a first-class cricket competition that took place in South Africa from November 2020 to March 2021. Six teams took part in the tournament, split into two groups. Lions were the defending champions.

Ahead of the opening round of fixtures, Warriors withdrew six members of its team due to COVID-19. Two players tested positive, with another four players withdrawn from being in direct contact with the two positive cases. The round five fixture between Titans and Dolphins was called off on the morning of day two, after a player returned a positive test for COVID-19. As a result of the increase in positive COVID-19 cases, the sixth round of matches, originally scheduled to start on 20 December 2020, was postponed until 2021.

In February 2021, Cricket South Africa issued a revised schedule for the last two rounds and the final of the tournament. The following month, Cricket South Africa also confirmed that this was the last season of franchise cricket, following a revamp to their domestic structure. Following the conclusion of the group stage, Dolphins and Titans had qualified for the final of the tournament. Despite nearly two days of play being lost due to rain, Dolphins went on to win the final by an innings and 76 runs, winning their first outright title.

Points tables

Pool A

Pool B

Fixtures

Round 1

Round 2

Round 3

Round 4

Round 5

Round 6

Round 7

Final

References

External links
 Series home at ESPN Cricinfo

South African domestic cricket competitions
CSA 4-Day Franchise Series
2020–21 South African cricket season
CSA 4-Day Franchise Series, 2020-21